The Brazilian Football Confederation (CBF) is the governing body of football in Brazil. The football confederation, as known today, separated from other sports associations on 24 September 1979. Between 1914 and 1979 it was the governing body, or at least the international reference, for other olympic sports, such as  tennis (until the CBT was founded in 1955), athletics (until the CBAt was founded in 1977), handball (until 1979), swimming and waterpolo. It currently has the most wins on FIFA world cups, with a total of five.

The CBF has its headquarters in Rio de Janeiro. The confederation owns a training center, named Granja Comary, located in Teresópolis.

It was announced on 29 September 2007, that the CBF would launch a women's league and cup competition in October 2007 following pressure from FIFA president Sepp Blatter during the 2007 FIFA Women's World Cup in China.

Association staff

References

External links

 Official website (Portuguese and English)
 CBF at YouTube

Other 
 Brazil at FIFA site
 Website official Santos FC affiliation CBF

 
Brazil
 
Football
Sports organizations established in 1914
1914 establishments in Brazil